In enzymology, an acetylornithine deacetylase is an enzyme that catalyzes the chemical reaction

N2-acetyl-L-ornithine + H2O  acetate + L-ornithine

Thus, the two substrates of this enzyme are N2-acetyl-L-ornithine and H2O, whereas its two products are acetate and L-ornithine.

This enzyme belongs to the family of hydrolases, those acting on carbon-nitrogen bonds other than peptide bonds, specifically in linear amides.  The systematic name of this enzyme class is N2-acetyl-L-ornithine amidohydrolase. Other names in common use include acetylornithinase, N-acetylornithinase, and 2-N-acetyl-L-ornithine amidohydrolase.  This enzyme participates in urea cycle and metabolism of amino groups.

Structural studies

References

 
 

EC 3.5.1
Enzymes of known structure